Michael Giblett (16 April 1934 – 31 January 1999) was an  Australian rules footballer who played with St Kilda in the Victorian Football League (VFL).

Notes

External links 

1934 births
1999 deaths
Australian rules footballers from Victoria (Australia)
St Kilda Football Club players
Cobden Football Club players